The Tetreauville Formation is a geological formation of Upper Ordovician age (Trentonian Stage), extending from the north of Trois-Rivières to the Island of Montreal.

See also

 List of fossiliferous stratigraphic units in Quebec

References

Ordovician Quebec
Ordovician southern paleotemperate deposits